Daniel Francis Murphy (August 11, 1876 in Philadelphia, Pennsylvania – November 22, 1955 in Jersey City, New Jersey) was a second baseman and outfielder in Major League Baseball from 1900 to 1915. He managed the Jersey City Skeeters in 1919.

Biography
Murphy spent most of his career with the Philadelphia Athletics and moved from second base to outfielder in 1910 to make room for the Athletics' new second baseman Eddie Collins. During the Athletics 1913 World Championship season, Murphy's playing time was limited by a broken knee cap; as a result, he did not play in the World Series, but served as the team's acting captain.

In 1,496 games, Murphy batted .289 (1563-5399) with 705 runs scored, 289 doubles, 102 triples, 44 home runs, 702 RBI, 193 stolen bases,, an on-base percentage of .336 and a slugging percentage of .405 in 16 seasons. In 16 World Series games, he hit .305 (18-59) with one home run and 12 RBI.

See also
 List of Major League Baseball career stolen bases leaders
 List of Major League Baseball career triples leaders
 List of Major League Baseball players to hit for the cycle
 List of Major League Baseball single-game hits leaders

References

External links

, or Retrosheet

1876 births
1955 deaths
19th-century baseball players
Baseball players from Philadelphia
Brooklyn Tip-Tops players
Major League Baseball second basemen
Minor league baseball managers
New Haven Murlins players
New York Giants (NL) players
Norwich Reds players
Philadelphia Athletics coaches
Philadelphia Athletics players
Philadelphia Athletics scouts
Philadelphia Phillies coaches